Mohammed Said Al-Habsi (born 14 May 1994), commonly known as Mohammed Al-Habsi, is an Omani footballer who plays for Muscat Club in Oman Professional League.

International career
Mohammed is part of the first team squad of the Oman national football team. He was selected for the national team for the first time in 2016. He made his first appearance for Oman on 24 March 2016 in a 2018 FIFA World Cup Qualification match against Guam.

References

External links
 
 
 

1994 births
Living people
People from Al-Mudhaibi
People from Muscat, Oman
Omani footballers
Oman international footballers
Association football midfielders
Muscat Club players
Oman Professional League players